In this list of birds by common name, a total of 10,976 extant and recently extinct (since 1500) bird species are recognised. Species marked with a "†" are extinct.

A

B

C

D

E

F

G

H

I

J

K

L

M

N

O

P

Q
Quailfinch
Quailfinch indigobird
Quail-plover
Quebracho crested tinamou

R

S

T

U

V

W

X
Xantus's hummingbird
Xavier's greenbul
Xingu scale-backed antbird

Y

Z

See also
List of birds
Lists of birds by region

References

Birds by common name
Lists of birds
Birds